Jean-Marc Rochette (born 23 April 1956) is a French painter, illustrator and comics creator.

He is best known and recognized for the comic book series Edmond le Cochon and Le Transperceneige, as well as for his illustrations of the literary classic Candide ou l'optimisme by Voltaire,  and Homer's Odyssey.

Career
Jean-Marc Rochette became known as a comic creator and illustrator with the story of Edmond le Cochon, with Martin Veyron, and (in succession of Alexis) Le Transperceneige, initially with Jacques Lob and later with Benjamin Legrand. 
Le Transperceneige received the Angoulême Religious Award in 1985, which was the award's first year. Other comic stories include Claudius Vigne, Napoléon et Bonaparte (Angoulême Humour Award in 2001), Nemo le capitaine vengeur with Jean-Pierre Hugot, L'or et l'esprit with Benjamin Legrand, Cour Royale with Martin Veyron (Nomination for the Angoulême Audience Award in 2006), and the trilogy Louis et Dico: Panique à Londres/Scandale à New York/Triomphe à Hollywood with René Pétillon.

Besides creating and illustrating comic stories, he also illustrated several children's books and well-known fairy tales, for example Coyote mauve, which was also translated in English (Purple Coyote), Pinocchio, Le petit poucet (the French version of Tom Thumb) and Le chat botté (Puss 'n' Boots). He gained further reputation for his watercolor illustrations of the literature classics Candide by Voltaire and Homer's Odyssey. As a painter, his works include watercolor as well as oil paintings, and figurative as well as abstract interpretations of themes.

Bibliography

Comics 

  (1980 - 1993 with Martin Veyron)
 No. 1: Edmond le cochon, Editions du Fromage 1980, 
 No. 2: Edmond le cochon va en afrique (1981), Albin Michel - l'Echo des Savanes 1983, 
 No. 3: Le continent mystérieux (1983), Albin Michel 1996, 
 No. 4: Le mystère continental, Albin Michel 1993, 
 Les dépoteurs de chrysanthèmes (drawing and story), Futuropolis 1980, 
 Le Transperceneige (1984–2000)
 No. 1: L'Échappe (drawing) with Jacques Lob (story), Casterman 1984, 
 No. 2: L'Arpenteur (drawing) with Benjamin Legrand (story), Casterman 1999, 
 No. 3: La Traversée (drawing) with Benjamin Legrand (story), Casterman 2000, 
 A tes souhaits (drawing) with T. Topin (story), Futuropolis 1985, 
 Claudius Vigne touche le fond (drawing and story), Casterman 1985, 
 Requiem blanc (drawing) with Benjamin Legrand (story), Casterman 1987, 
 Nemo, le capitaine vengeur (drawing) with Jean-Pierre Hugot (storyboard), featuring Jules Verne's fictional character Captain Nemo, Bayard 1988, 
 L'Or & l'esprit 1, Le Tribut (drawing) with Benjamin Legrand (story), Casterman 1995, 
 Napoléon et Bonaparte (story and drawing), Casterman 2000, 
 Louis et Dico - à la conquete du monde (2003 - 2006 with René Pétillon)
 Panique à Londres (drawing), Albin Michel 2003, 
 Scandale à New York''' (drawing), Albin Michel 2004, 
 Triomphe à Hollywood (drawing), Albin Michel 2006, 
 Cour royale (drawing) with Martin Veyron (story), Albin Michel 2005, 
 TooLoose, with Martin Veyron, Blutch, Baru, Jean-Bernard Pouy, Casterman 2007, 
 , Casterman, 2019 
 La Dernière Reine (bande dessinée),  Casterman, 2022

 Illustrations 

 Children's books 

 Coyote mauve with Jean-Luc Cornette, L'école des loisirs 1997, 
 in English: Purple Coyote, Random House Children's Books 1999, 
 Pizza quatre saisons with Jean-Luc Cornette, L'école des Loisirs 1997, 
 C'est difficile à dire with Jean-Luc Cornette, Seuil 1998, 
 Le joli petit cafard with Jean-Luc Cornette, Le Seuil 1998, 
 Pinocchio, French translation of the Italian novel for children by Carlo Collodi, Casterman 2000, 
 Le petit poucet by Charles Perrault, French fairy tale paralleling the story of Tom Thumb, Casterman 2001, 
 in Spanish: Pulgarcito, Blume 2005, 
 Le chat botté (Puss 'n' Boots), French version of the European fairy tale by Charles Perrault, Casterman 2002, 
 in Spanish: El gato con botas, Blume 2005, 
 La fille du pirate with Béatrice Bottet, Bayard Jeunesse 2004, 

 Classics 

 Candide ou l'optimisme by French writer and philosopher Voltaire, Albin Michel 2002, 
 L'Odyssée (Odyssey), French translation by Mario Meunier of the Greek epic poem attributed to Homer, Albin Michel 2006, 

 Awards 

 1985: Religious Award at the Angoulême International Comics Festival, for Le Transperceneige, with Jacques Lob
 2001: Humour Award at the Angoulême International Comics Festival,  for Napoléon et Bonaparte 2006: nomination for the Audience Award at the Angoulême International Comics Festival, for Cour Royale'', with Martin Veyron

Notes

References 

 Biographical information from editor Casterman 
 Biographical information from Momes.net 
 Biographical information on Lambiek's Comiclopedia
 Jean-Marc Rochette comics bibliography on Bedetheque

External links 
 
 Original sketches by Jean-Marc Rochette for Transperceneige, presented by editor Casterman

Living people
1956 births
French graphic novelists
People from Baden-Baden